The 1932 Major League Baseball season was contested from April 11 to October 2, 1932. The Chicago Cubs and New York Yankees were the regular season champions of the National League and American League, respectively. The Yankees then defeated the Cubs in the World Series, four games to none.

The Brooklyn team in the National League, known as the Robins since 1914, reverted to the name Dodgers, which they had last used in 1913.

Awards and honors
MLB Most Valuable Player Award
 Jimmie Foxx, Philadelphia Athletics, 1B
 Chuck Klein, Philadelphia Phillies, OF

Events

July 10 – Philadelphia Athletics pitcher Eddie Rommel sets a record for the most batters faced by a relief pitcher, after facing 87 batters in an 18–17, 18 innings victory over the Cleveland Indians.

MLB statistical leaders

Standings

American League

National League

Postseason

Bracket

Managers

American League

National League

Home Field Attendance

References

External links
1932 Major League Baseball season schedule at Baseball Reference

 
Major League Baseball seasons